Justin Kirkland (born August 2, 1996) is a Canadian professional ice hockey left winger currently playing for the San Diego Gulls of the American Hockey League (AHL), while under contract for the Anaheim Ducks of the National Hockey League (NHL).

Playing career 

After playing two years of bantam triple-A level hockey for the Camrose Kodiaks U15 AAA team of the Alberta Major Bantam Hockey League, Kirkland was selected by the Kelowna Rockets in the fifth round, 103rd overall, of the 2011 Western Hockey League Bantam Draft. After playing from 2011 to 2013 in Saskatchewan at the Athol Murray College of Notre Dame, Kirkland cracked the Rockets' roster full-time in the 2013–14 season and finished eighth in team scoring with 48 points in 68 games.

Impressed by his WHL rookie season, the Nashville Predators selected Kirkland in the third round of the 2014 NHL Entry Draft, 62nd overall. Kirkland scored 51 points in 50 games in the 2014–15 WHL season and helped the Rockets capture the Ed Chynoweth Cup as WHL champions. Following another successful year in 2015–16, Kirkland signed a three-year, entry-level contract with the Predators on May 16, 2016.

Kirkland spent four games with the Predators' then-ECHL affiliate, the Cincinnati Cyclones, in 2016–17; however, he largely played in the American Hockey League with the Milwaukee Admirals. He spent the following two seasons exclusively with the Admirals with his best single-season output — nine goals and 30 points — coming in 2018–19, his final year in the Predators' organization. A restricted free-agent in the summer of 2019, Kirkland was not issued a qualifying offer by the Predators and became an unrestricted free-agent eligible to sign with any NHL team.

On July 1, 2019, Kirkland signed a one-year contract with the Calgary Flames, reuniting him with Rockets teammate Dillon Dubé. Kirkland was assigned to the Flames' AHL affiliate, the Stockton Heat, for the 2019–20 season. He had his best offensive season as a professional, scoring six goals and 28 points in 53 games, and was re-signed by the Flames to another one-year deal on September 28, 2020.

As a free agent from the Flames, Kirkland signed a one-year, two-way contract with the Anaheim Ducks on July 14, 2022.

Career statistics

Awards and honours

References

External links 

 

1996 births
Living people
Anaheim Ducks players
Canadian ice hockey left wingers
Cincinnati Cyclones (ECHL) players
Kelowna Rockets players
Milwaukee Admirals players
Nashville Predators draft picks
San Diego Gulls (AHL) players
Stockton Heat players
Sportspeople from Alberta